Carnicero is an occupational surname literally meaning butcher, slaughterer in Spanish. Notable people with the surname include:

Antonio Carnicero, Spanish painter
Alejandro Carnicero, Spanish sculptor

See also

Occupational surnames
Spanish-language surnames